Buddhadev Bhattacharya was sworn in as the chief minister of West Bengal in the sixth Left Front government along with other 47 ministers. Members of the Left Front Ministry in the Indian state of West Bengal as in May 2006 were as follows:

Cabinet ministers
 Buddhadeb Bhattacharjee - Chief Minister; Home (Police), Information and Cultural Affairs, Science and Technology
Nirupam Sen - Industry, Public Undertakings & Industrial Reconstruction, Planning & Development
 Dr Surjya Kanta Mishra - Health & Family welfare, Rural Development, Panchayat
 Mohammed Amin - Labour
 Asim Dasgupta - Finance
 Subhas Chakraborty - Transport, Sports, Hooghly River Bridge Commissioners
 Mohammed Salim - Minorities Development & Welfare, Self-employment Scheme for the Urban Unemployed, Youth Services, Technical Education
Kamal Guha - Agriculture
Biswanath Chowdhury - Social Welfare, Jails
 Kiranmoy Nanda - Fisheries, Aquaculture, Aquatic Resources, Harbours
 Nandagopal Bhattacharjee - Small Irrigation, Water Investigation Development
 Prabodh Sinha - Parliamentary Affairs & Excise
Kalimuddin Shams - Food & Supplies
 Amar Chaudhuri - Public Works
 Gautam Deb - Housing & Public Health and Engineering
Kanti Biswas - School Education, Madrasah
Naren De - Cooperation & Consumer Affairs
Manabendra Mukherjee - Information Technology & Environment
Ashok Bhattacharya - Municipal Affairs, Urban Development, Town and Country Planning
Dinesh Dakua - Tourism
 Sailen Sarkar - Food Processing and Horticulture
Satyasadhan Chakravarty - Higher Education
 Amarendralal Roy - Irrigation and Waterways
Abdur Razzak Molla - Land and Land Reforms
 Mrinal Banerjee - Power
Bansa Gopal Chowdhury - Cottage & Small Scale Industry
Nisith Adhikary - Law and Judicial Department
 Upen Kisku - Scheduled Castes, Scheduled Tribes, and Other Backward Classes Welfare
Anisur Rahman - Animal Resources Development
Jogesh Chandra Barman - Forests
Nemai Mal - Library Services
Nandarani Dal - Mass Education
 Chhaya Ghosh - Agriculture Marketing
 Hafiz Alam Sairani - Relief

Ministers of State
Pratim Chatterjee - Fire Services
Dhiren Sen - Land and Land Reforms, Panchayats and Rural Development
Susanta Ghosh - Labour, Employment Exchange, Employees’ State Insurance (ESI)
 Dasrath Tirkey - Public Works
Maheswar Murmu - Pashchimanchal Development and Forests
Anju Kar - Municipal Affairs
 Bilasibala Sahis - Scheduled Castes, Scheduled Tribes, and OBC
Ganesh Chandra Mondal - Irrigation & Waterways
Srikumar Mukherjee - Civil Defence
 Kanti Ganguly - Sunderbans Development Affairs
Pratyush Mukherjee - Health & Family Welfare
Narayan Biswas - Transport
 Nayan Sarkar - Refugee Rehabilitation
 Ibha Dey - School Education

See also
Third Bhattacharjee ministry
Left Front (West Bengal)

Notes

References

West Bengal ministries
West Bengal